Brenton Klaebe (born 23 October 1966) is a former Australian rules footballer who played for Fitzroy in the Australian Football League (AFL) in 1991. He was recruited from the Norwood Football Club in the South Australian National Football League (SANFL) with the 31st selection in the 1988 VFL Draft.

References

External links

Living people
1966 births
Fitzroy Football Club players
Norwood Football Club players
Australian rules footballers from South Australia